Lyman Ward may refer to:

Lyman Ward (actor) (b. 1941), Canadian actor
Lyman Ward (clergyman) (1868–1948), Universalist minister
Lyman M. Ward (1836–1909), Civil War general